Bellemont Mill Village Historic District is a national historic district located at Bellemont, Alamance County, North Carolina. It encompasses 24 contributing buildings built between 1879 and 1880 in Bellemont.  The district includes the three-story brick Bellemont Cotton Hill and 23 associated one and two-story frame mill houses.

It was added to the National Register of Historic Places in 1987.

References

Historic districts on the National Register of Historic Places in North Carolina
Historic districts in Alamance County, North Carolina
National Register of Historic Places in Alamance County, North Carolina
Company towns in North Carolina